The Green Man was released in 2000 and is the twenty first studio album by Roy Harper.

History

The album takes its name from an ancient character / representation found, principally, throughout Western Europe. The Green Man may be carved in stone or wood, found in churches, or painted on pub signage and is usually a representation of a face surrounded by (or made from) leaves. Harper's face can also be seen within the leaves upon the album's cover.

Canadian musician Jeff Martin plays a variety of instruments on eight of the album's eleven songs.

Track listing
All tracks credited to Roy Harper except "The Apology" - Jeff Martin / Roy Harper
 "The Green Man" – 5:35
 "Wishing Well" – 5:53
 "Sexy Woman" – 6:30
 "The Apology" – 2:58
 "Midnight Sun" – 4:22
 "Glasto" – 4:24
 "The Monster" – 8:22
 "New England" – 4:42
 "Solar Wind Sculptures" – 3:36
 "Rushing Camelot" – 8:46
 "All in All" – 4:50

Personnel
 Roy Harper – guitar and vocals, left shaker
 Jeff Martin – hurdy-gurdy, 12 string slide. electric guitar. mandolin, recorder, bongos, tambourine, right shaker, guitar, 6 string, slide guitar
 John Fitzgerald – keyboard
 Paddy Keenan – uilleann pipes, low D whistle
 Colm O'Sullivan – mandolin, recorder, low D whistle
 Chris Thorpe – mastering
 Harry Pearce – cover design

References

External links
 Roy Harper official site
 Excellent Roy Harper resource

Roy Harper (singer) albums
2000 albums

it:The Green Man